Alberni Valley is a broad valley located at the head of Alberni Inlet on Vancouver Island in British Columbia, Canada. It is home to Port Alberni, Sproat Lake and other outlining areas. The term is largely used as a synonym for Greater Port Alberni and adjoining communities but is used in a larger regional sense as well. Various local organizations and companies use the term "Alberni Valley" in their name, e.g. the Alberni Valley Times and Alberni Valley News newspapers the Alberni Valley Chamber of Commerce and the Alberni Valley Bulldogs minor hockey team. The Canadian pioneer, Joe Drinkwater lived in Alberni Valley during the late nineteenth and early twentieth centuries.

Geography
 Mount Arrowsmith is the largest mountain on southern Vancouver Island. It has some of the most accessible alpine and sub-alpine areas for Victoria and other large towns on the Island. These zones contain several rare and endangered species of plants and animals, the most notable of which is the Vancouver Island Marmot, which has the dubious distinction of being Canada's rarest mammal. Although the mountain is contained within a UNESCO Biosphere Reserve it is not part of a park. Efforts are currently underway to confer official park status on the alpine areas of the Arrowsmith massif and surrounding areas.
Beaufort Range North of Port Alberni and west of Qualicum Beach.
Ash Lake
Buttle Lake
Cameron Lake
Devils Den Lake
Dickson Lake
Doran Lake
Elsie Lake
Esary Lake
Father and Son Lake
Gracie Lake
Great Central Lake is a large lake in the Alberni Valley The lake has a surface area of 51 square kilometres and a maximum depth of 294 m. It takes its name from the fact that it is a large lake in the center of Vancouver Island.
Hucuktlis Lake
Henry Lake
Horne Lake
Kammat Lake
Kennedy Lake is the largest lake on Vancouver Island, British Columbia, Canada. Located northeast of Ucluelet on the Island's central west coast, the lake is formed chiefly by the confluence of the Clayoquot and Kennedy Rivers. 
Klitsa Mountain
Labour Day Lake
Lacy Lake
Little Toquart Lake
Lizard Pond
Lowry Lake
Long Lake
McLaughlin Lake
Maggie Lake 
Marshy Lake
Muriel Lake
Nahmint Lake
Nitinat Lake
Sproat Lake, named after Gilbert Malcolm Sproat, is a lake in central Vancouver Island. Home of the last Martin Mars Waterbombers, and nearby to Port Alberni.
Tsable Lake
Toquart Lake
Turnbull Lake
Turtle Lake
Uchuck Lake
Stamp Falls
Stamp River
Somass River
Kennedy River
Ash River
Taylor River
Rogers Creek
China Creek
Drinkwater Creek

Cherry Creek
Beaver Creek
Sproat River
Barkley Sound
Della Falls  Della Falls is a waterfall in Strathcona Provincial Park on Vancouver Island. It is widely regarded as the tallest in Canada.

First Nations
First Nations cultures are an essential part of the Alberni Valley's makeup. The Tseshaht and the Hupacasath are two of the tribes that make up the Nuu-chah-nulth Tribal Council.

References

External links
Alberni Valley Tourism (official website)

 
Valleys of British Columbia
West Coast of Vancouver Island